Hate Yourself with Style is the sixth studio album by Swedish rap metal band Clawfinger, released on 18 November 2005 via Nuclear Blast. It continues the path entered on Zeros & Heroes and is characterized by speedy melodic hard rock guitar riffs. The keyboards which particularly characterized A Whole Lot of Nothing have completely disappeared.

The social commentary within the album (including rants against rapists and positing that homophobes are themselves secretly gay) received both positive and negative reviews.

Unlike the previous albums, where the limited edition version had two or more bonus tracks, the limited edition of this album has a DVD with live footage from the Greenfield Festival and video clips of all singles up to Clawfinger's third album.

Track listing

Disc 1 
 "The Faggot in You" – 3:26
 "Hate Yourself with Style" – 3:44
 "Dirty Lies" – 2:58
 "The Best & The Worst" – 3:48
 "Breakout (Embrace the Child Inside You)" – 3:41
 "Right to Rape" – 4:31
 "What We've Got Is What You're Getting" – 2:22
 "Sick of Myself" – 3:22
 "Hypocrite" – 3:04
 "Without a Case" – 3:40
 "God Is Dead" – 4:44

There is a hidden bonus track at the beginning. Pause track 1 and rewind and there is a track with talking and some drums.

Disc 2 (limited edition) 
Live Greenfield Festival
 "Rosegrove"
 "Nigger"
 "Zeros & Heroes"
 "Warfair"
 "Don't Get Me Wrong"
 "Recipe For Hate"
 "Biggest & the Best"
 "The Truth"
 "Do What I Say"

Video clips
 "Nigger" (version 2)
 "The Truth"
 "Warfair"
 "Pin Me Down"
 "Do What I Say"
 "Tomorrow"
 "Biggest & The Best"
 "Two Sides"

Released singles 

 "Dirty Lies"
 "Without a Case"

Released video clips 
 "Dirty Lies"
 "Hate Yourself with Style"
 "Without a Case"

References 

Clawfinger albums
2005 albums